Hortense (Golden) Canady (August 18, 1927 – October 23, 2010) was a civil rights leader, the first African American elected to the Lansing Board of Education. She served as national president of Delta Sigma Theta sorority from 1983-1988.

Biography
Canady was born Elizabeth Hortense Golden on August 18, 1927 in Chicago, Illinois.  At age 16, she enrolled in Fisk University, where she met her husband. The two were married on her 18th birthday, prior to his deployment during World War II. She continued her education at Fisk and later received a Bachelor of Science degree in Zoology.  Later in life, she went back to school and received a master's degree in higher education from Michigan State University.

Her daughter Alexa Canady was the first African-American woman to become a neurosurgeon.

References

External links
 

1927 births
People from Chicago
Fisk University alumni
Michigan State University alumni
2010 deaths
Delta Sigma Theta members
Educators from Illinois
American women educators
21st-century American women
Delta Sigma Theta presidents